The 1995 season was the Hawthorn Football Club's 71st season in the Australian Football League and 94th overall.

Fixture

Premiership season

Ladder

References

Hawthorn Football Club seasons